Central Star consists of four residential skyscrapers under construction in Busan, South Korea. Ground was broken by POSCO E&C in 2007 and is completing in 2011.

References

 

Buildings and structures in Busan
Residential buildings completed in 2011